Dabasa ciminius is a species of butterfly in the family Papilionidae.

Other members of the genus Dabasa include:
Dabasa amphis
Dabasa arribas
Dabasa brunei
Dabasa evan
Dabasa gyas
Dabasa hegylus
Dabasa lachinus
Dabasa langsonensis
Dabasa nagamasai
Dabasa payeni
Dabasa porus
Dabasa sciron

References

Dabasa